People with the surname Sansone:
 Susanna-Assunta Sansone - Professor of Data Readiness at the University of Oxford
 Gilda Sansone - Italian fashion model 
 Greg Sansone - Canadian sports anchor
 Gianluca Sansone (born 1987) Italian footballer
 Giovanni Sansone - Italian mathematician
 Kathryn Sansone - American homemaker
 Johnny Sansone (born 1957), is an American electric blues musician 
 Lorenzo Sansone - horn player, music editor, educator, and horn manufacturer. 
 Maggie Sansone - American recording artist 
 Maria Sansone - American TV host
 Matteo Sansone (musicologist) - Italian musicologist (opera)
 Matteo Sansone (archaeologist) - (1916-1992), Italian pharmacist and archaeologist
 Nicola Sansone - Italian footballer
 Pat Sansone - American multi-instrumentalist
 Raffaele Sansone - (1910-1994), Italo-Uruguayan football player and coach

Surnames of Italian origin